Davudlu (also, Dovudlu) is a village in the Agdash Rayon of Azerbaijan.

References 

Populated places in Agdash District